Giulio Spisanelli (died 1658) was an Italian painter of the Baroque period, active mainly in Bologna.

Spisanelli was born at Bologna. His brother was the painter Ippolito Bolognese. He first trained under the painter Vincenzo Spisanelli, his father, then under Domenico Maria Canuti. He traveled to Rome at the instigation of his father, but died soon after returning to Bologna.

References

Year of birth unknown
1658 deaths
17th-century Italian painters
Italian male painters
Painters from Bologna
Italian Baroque painters
Date of death unknown